Westenholz is a surname. Notable people with the surname include:

Anders Westenholz (1936–2010), Danish psychologist and writer
Charles Westenholz (1945–2006), British alpine skier
Elisabeth Westenholz (born 1942), Danish classical pianist and organist
Joan Goodnick Westenholz (1943–2013), American archaeologist
Piers Westenholz (born 1943), British alpine skier
Sophia Maria Westenholz (1759–1838), German classical composer, musician, singer and music educator